is a josei manga by Maki Kusumoto. Published in Japan by Shodensha and licensed in English by Tokyopop.

Characters 
 Mitsu – Deeply disturbed female protagonist with an interest in art.
 Kishi – Love–struck male protagonist working as a bookstore clerk.

Reception 
Dominic Nguyen of Newtype USA and Carlo Santos of Anime News Network have noted the artwork in this romantic tragedy.

References

External links 
 

Josei manga
Romance anime and manga
Shodensha manga
Tokyopop titles